Ildikó Enyedi (born 15 November 1955) is a Hungarian film director and screenwriter. Her 2017 film On Body and Soul won the top prize at the 67th Berlin International Film Festival and went on to be nominated for a Foreign Language Academy Award. She has directed eight feature films since 1989.

Early life and education
Enyedi was born in Budapest in 1955. Her father, György Enyedi, was a geographer and economist who played a major role in the long-term development of regional science. She completed a B.A. in economics, studied film studies at the Academy of Drama and Film in Budapest starting in 1980, and also studied film in Montpellier. In the beginning, Enyedi created conceptual art and was a part of Balázs Béla Studio and the Indigo group.

Career

Enyedi won the Golden Camera award for My 20th Century at the 1989 Cannes Film Festival.  She began teaching at Academy of Drama and Film in Budapest (now known as the University of Theatre and Film Arts) that same year. In 1992, she was a member of the jury at the 42nd Berlin International Film Festival. Her 1994 film Magic Hunter was entered into the main competition at the 51st edition of the Venice Film Festival.  In 2007, she was a member of the jury at the 29th Moscow International Film Festival. She received her doctorate from the University of Theatre and Film Arts in 2011.

In 2012 Enyedi was hired by HBO Europe to direct the Hungarian show Terápia, an adaptation of the Israeli show BeTipul about a therapist who spends his week helping others before getting his own psychological help. Enyedi described the project as "healing" after years of projects stuck in development hell. In total Enyedi directed 39 episodes over three seasons from 2012 to 2017.

Enyedi's 2017 film On Body and Soul premiered at the 67th Berlin International Film Festival, where it won the Golden Bear. The film went on to be nominated for the Academy Award for Best Foreign Language Film, representing Hungary.

In 2018, she announced her next film would be an adaptation of The Story of My Wife, about a man who makes a bet with his friend to marry the next woman who walks into the café where they are eating. The film was adapted from a novel by Milán Füst of the same name.

She was previously the president of the Hungarian Directors' Guild.

Personal life
Enyedi is married to author Wilhelm Droste, has two children, and lives in Budapest and Nordrhein Westfalen, Germany. In 2002 she was awarded with the Officer's Cross of the Order of Merit.

Filmography

 Flirt (1979), experimental
 The Spectator (1981), short film
 Rózsalovag (1984), short film
 New Books (1985), short film
 Mole (1985), short film
 Invasion (1986), short film
 Goblins (1988), short film
 My 20th Century (1989)
 Magic Hunter (1994)
 A Gyár (1995)
 Tamas and Juli (1997), made for 2000, Seen By... 
 Simon, the Magician (1999)
 Európából Európába (2004)
 Első szerelem (2008)
 On Body and Soul (2017)
 The Story of My Wife (2021)

References

External links

1955 births
Living people
Hungarian film directors
Hungarian women film directors
Hungarian screenwriters
Women screenwriters
Hungarian women writers
Writers from Budapest
Directors of Caméra d'Or winners
Directors of Golden Bear winners
20th-century screenwriters
Women film directors